The 1968 AFC Youth Championship was held in Seoul, South Korea.

Teams
The following teams entered the tournament:

 
 
 
 
 
 
 
 
 
  (host)

First round

Group A

Group B

Group C

Second round

Group 1

Group 2

Semifinals

Third place match

Final

External links
Results by RSSSF

AFC U-19 Championship
1967-68 in Israeli football
1968 in Asian football
1968 in South Korean sport
International association football competitions hosted by South Korea
1968 in youth association football